Alexandru Vulpe (June 16, 1931 – February 9, 2016) was a Romanian historian and archaeologist, member of the Romanian Academy and director of the Vasile Pârvan Institute of Archaeology.

Life 
He graduated from the Faculty of History of the University of Bucharest in 1954, where he studied ancient history and classical philology.

In 1965, he became a scientific researcher at the Vasile Pârvan Institute of Archaeology, and in 1968 earned his doctorate in history for Necropola hallstattiană de la Ferigile: Monografie arheologică (The Hallstattian necropolis of Ferigile: Archaeological monograph), supervised by Ion Nestor. Beginning in 1976, Vulpe was correspondent member of the German Archaeological Institute and member of the permanent council of the International Union for Prehistoric and Protohistoric Sciences (IUPPS).

In 2000, Vulpe was made a commander of the Order of the Star of Romania. In 2009, he was elected a titular member of the Romanian Academy.

References 

1931 births
2016 deaths
Archaeologists from Bucharest
20th-century Romanian historians
University of Bucharest alumni
Titular members of the Romanian Academy
Commanders of the Order of the Star of Romania